Proagriocharis is a genus of extinct turkey relatives from the upper Pliocene. It contained a single species, Proagriocharis kimballensis, known from Nebraska, which was smaller than most other turkeys.

References

Tetraonini
Pliocene birds
Pliocene birds of North America
Fossil taxa described in 1970
Taxa named by Larry Martin
Prehistoric bird genera
Extinct monotypic bird genera